The 2019 Ole Miss Rebels softball team represents the University of Mississippi in the 2019 NCAA Division I softball season. The Rebels play their home games at the Ole Miss Softball Complex.

Previous season

The Rebels finished the 2018 season 32–25 overall, and 7–17 in the conference. The Rebels entered the 2018 NCAA Division I softball tournament as the #2 seed in the Arizona State regional. The Rebels were defeated by the Sun Devils in the Regional Finals.

Roster

Schedule and results

Schedule Source:

Oxford Regional

References

Ole Miss
Ole Miss Rebels softball seasons
Ole Miss Rebels softball
Ole Miss